Following is a list of justices of the Kansas Supreme Court. , the Kansas Supreme Court has seven justices.

Justices

See also

 Lists of people from Kansas

External links
History of the Kansas Supreme Court Justices from the Kansas Judicial Branch.

Justices of the Kansas Supreme Court
Justices of the Kansas Supreme Court
Kansas